Liangchi Zhang (born July 1958) is an Australian mechanical engineer and scientist. Zhang has been Professor of Mechanical Engineering and the Director of the Graduate School of Engineering, University of Sydney, Australia. He is now a Scientia Professor and Australian Professional Fellow at the University of New South Wales.

Biography 
Zhang was born in Huangyan District, Taizhou, Zhejiang Province, China in July 1958. Zhang received BS in 1982 and ME in 1985 both from Zhejiang University in Hangzhou. Zhang obtained PhD in 1988 from Peking University in Beijing. From 1989 to 1991, Zhang did postdoctoral research at the University of Cambridge in UK. From 1991 to 1992, Zhang was a research fellow in the Mechanical Engineering Laboratory of MITI in Japan. Zhang received an honorary Doctor of Engineering in 2005 from the University of Sydney.

Zhang was the Chairman of the 6th Asia-Pacific Symposium on Engineering Plasticity and Its Applications in Sydney in 2002 (AEPA2002); the Chairman of the 3rd Australasian Congress on Applied Mechanics in Sydney in 2002 (ACAM2002); and the Chairman of the 1st International Symposium on Advances in Abrasive Technology in Sydney in 1997 (ISAAT'97). Zhang is the Editor-in-Chief of the International Journal of Surface Science and Engineering.

Zhang was elected as Fellow of Australian Academy of Technological Sciences and Engineering in 2006.

References

External links 
 Prof. Liangchi Zhang's homepage
 About Professor Liangchi Zhang, the University of Sydney
 Lifeboat Foundation Bios: Professor Liangchi Zhang

1958 births
Scientists from Taizhou, Zhejiang
Australian engineers
Zhejiang University alumni
Peking University alumni
Academic staff of the University of Sydney
Chinese emigrants to Australia
Living people
Academic staff of the University of New South Wales
Fellows of the Australian Academy of Technological Sciences and Engineering